Alcurve is an unincorporated community in central Alberta, Canada within the County of Vermilion River.

Localities in the County of Vermilion River